Hunter C. Haynes (1867January 1, 1918) was an innovator of strops to sharpen razor blades, founded a barbershop supply company, and was a film producer and film company founder. His parents had been enslaved for part of their lives. He established Haynes Photoplay Company after working as a producer at the white-owned Afro-American Film Company. He was lauded as a Black filmmaker.

Afflicted with tuberculosis, he resided in Saranac, New York to recuperate but died on New Year's Day 1918. He was buried in his hometown of Selma, Alabama.

Filmography
Uncle Remus' First Visit to New York (1914)

References

1867 births
1918 deaths
Film producers from Alabama
African-American film producers
19th-century American businesspeople
20th-century African-American people